These are the lists of colors;
 List of colors: A–F
 List of colors: G–M
 List of colors: N–Z
 List of colors (compact)
 List of colors by shade
 List of color palettes
 List of Crayola crayon colors
 List of RAL colors
 List of X11 color names

See also 
 Index of color-related articles
 List of dyes

Templates that list color names